The GEOStar-1 is a communications satellite spacecraft model made by Northrop Grumman Innovation Systems in the late 1990s for telecommunications in geosynchronous orbit. The GEOStar-1 satellite bus is designed for a 15-year mission and was compatible with the Ariane 4, Ariane 5, Delta II, Proton (rocket family), and Long March (rocket family).

Satellite Orders

References

Satellite buses
Orbital Sciences Corporation